Matilda is a children's novel written by British writer Roald Dahl and illustrated by Quentin Blake. It was published in 1988 by Jonathan Cape. The story features Matilda Wormwood, a precocious child with an uncaring mother and father, and her time in school run by the tyrannical headmistress Miss Trunchbull.

The book has been adapted in various media, including as an audio reading by actress Kate Winslet, a 1996 feature film directed by Danny DeVito, a two-part BBC Radio 4 program, and a 2010 to 2011 musical which has run on the West End in London, Broadway in New York, and around the world. A film adaptation of the musical was released in 2022. 

In 2003, Matilda was listed at number 1 in The Big Read, a BBC survey of the British public of the top 200 novels of all time. In 2012, Matilda was ranked number 30 among all-time best children's novels in a survey published by School Library Journal, a US monthly. Time magazine named Matilda in its list of the 100 Best Young-Adult Books of All Time. In 2012, Matilda Wormwood appeared on a Royal Mail commemorative postage stamp.

Plot 
In a small Buckinghamshire village forty minutes by bus away from Reading and 8 miles from Aylesbury, Matilda Wormwood is born to Mr and Mrs Wormwood. She immediately shows amazing precocity, learning to speak at age one and to read at age three and a half, perusing all the children's books in the library by the age of four and three months and moving on to longer classics such as Great Expectations and Jane Eyre. However, her parents emotionally abuse her and completely refuse to acknowledge her abilities; to keep from getting frustrated, Matilda finds herself forced to pull pranks on them, such as gluing her father's hat to his head, sticking a parrot in the chimney to simulate a burglar or ghost, and bleaching her father's hair with peroxide.

At the age of five and a half, Matilda enters school and befriends her teacher Jennifer Honey, who is astonished by her intellectual abilities. Miss Honey tries to move Matilda into a higher class, but the tyrannical headmistress, Miss Agatha Trunchbull, refuses. Miss Honey also tries to talk to Mr and Mrs Wormwood about their daughter's intelligence, but they ignore her, with the mother contending "brainy-ness" is an undesirable trait in a little girl.

Miss Trunchbull later confronts a girl called Amanda Thripp for wearing pigtails (the headmistress repeatedly displays a dislike of long hair throughout the book) and does a hammer throw with the girl over the playground fence.

Matilda quickly develops a particularly strong bond with Miss Honey and watches as  Trunchbull terrorises her students with deliberately creative, over-the-top punishments to prevent parents from believing them, such as throwing them in a dark closet dubbed "The Chokey", which is lined with nails and broken glass. When Matilda's friend Lavender plays a practical joke on Trunchbull by placing a newt in her jug of water, Matilda is blamed; in anger, she uses an unexpected power of telekinesis to tip the glass of water containing the newt onto Trunchbull.	

Matilda reveals her new powers to Miss Honey, who confides that after her wealthy father, Dr Magnus Honey, suspiciously died, she was raised by an abusive aunt, revealed to be Miss Trunchbull. Trunchbull appears, among other misdeeds, to be withholding her niece's inheritance; Miss Honey has to live in poverty in a derelict farm cottage, and her salary is being paid into Miss Trunchbull's bank account for the first 10 years of her teaching career while she is restricted to £1 per week in pocket money. Preparing to avenge Miss Honey, Matilda practises her telekinesis at home. Later, during a sadistic lesson that Miss Trunchbull is teaching, Matilda telekinetically raises a piece of chalk to the blackboard and begins to use it to write, posing as the spirit of Magnus Honey. Addressing Miss Trunchbull using her first name (Agatha), "Magnus" demands that Miss Trunchbull hand over Miss Honey's house and wages and leave the school, causing Miss Trunchbull to faint.

The next day, the school's deputy headmaster, Mr Trilby, visits Trunchbull's house and finds it empty, except for signs of Trunchbull's hasty exit. She is never seen again, and the next day Miss Honey receives a letter from a local solicitor's office, telling her that her father's lifetime savings were safe in her bank and the property she lived in as a child was left to her. Trilby becomes the new headmaster, proving himself to be capable and good-natured, overwhelmingly improving the school's atmosphere and curriculum, and quickly moving Matilda into the top-form class with the 11-year-olds. Rather to Matilda's relief, she soon is no longer capable of telekinesis. Miss Honey theorises this is because Matilda is using her brainpower on a more challenging curriculum, leaving less of her brain's enormous energy free.

Matilda continues to visit Miss Honey at her house regularly, returning home one day to find her parents and her older brother Michael hastily packing to leave for Spain. Miss Honey explains this is because the police found out Mr Wormwood has been selling stolen cars. Matilda asks permission to live with Miss Honey, to which her parents rather distractedly agree. Matilda and Miss Honey find their happy ending, as the Wormwoods drive away, never to be seen again.

Writing the novel
Dahl's initial draft for the novel portrayed Matilda as a wicked, irrational girl, her name being drawn from Hilaire Belloc's poem "Matilda Who Told Such Dreadful Lies," who tortured her innocent parents and used her psychokinetic powers to help an unethical teacher win money at horse racing. Dahl's biographer Jeremy Treglown went through the authors documents, including the drafts for the novel, and noted that the American editor Stephen Roxburgh at Farrar, Straus and Giroux had been instrumental in reshaping the story. It was the editor's idea to make Matilda an innocent child who loved books, with her powers manifesting as a result of abuse she endured. Roxburgh also suggested various changes to the main characters that were incorporated into the finished novel. As Dahl decided to take the manuscript to a different publishers the two had a falling out. The edited version of the manuscript was published by Puffin Books. Dahl explained in an interview that he "got it wrong" at first and that the book took over a year to rewrite though he failed to mention Roxburgh's input.

Reception
In 2003, Matilda was listed at number 74 in The Big Read, a BBC poll of the British public of the top 200 novels of all time. In 2012 Matilda was ranked number 30 on a list of the top 100 children's novels published by School Library Journal, a monthly with primarily US audience. It was the first of four books by Dahl among the Top 100, more than any other writer. Time magazine included Matilda in its list of the 100 Best Young-Adult Books of All Time. Worldwide sales have reached 17 million, and since 2016 sales have spiked to the extent that it outsells Dahl's other works.

Dahl's inspiration 
The "mean and loathsome" Mrs Pratchett, owner of the sweet shop Dahl frequented as a boy in Cardiff, inspired Dahl's creation of Miss Trunchbull. Mr Wormwood was based on a real-life character from Dahl's home village of Great Missenden in Buckinghamshire. The library in Great Missenden was the inspiration for Mrs Phelps's library, where Matilda devours classic literature by the age of four and three months. On Matilda's love of reading books, Lucy Dahl stated that her father’s novel was, in part, about his love for books: “I think that there was a deep genuine fear within his heart that books were going to go away and he wanted to write about it.”

Adaptations

In 1990, the Redgrave Theatre in Farnham produced a musical version, adapted by Rony Robinson with music by Ken Howard and Alan Blaikley, which toured the UK. It starred Annabelle Lanyon as Matilda and Jonathan Linsley as Miss Trunchbull and had mixed reviews. A second musical version of the novel, Matilda the Musical, written by Dennis Kelly and Tim Minchin and commissioned by the Royal Shakespeare Company, premiered in November 2010. It opened at the Cambridge Theatre in the West End on 24 November 2011. It opened on Broadway on 11 April 2013 at the Shubert Theatre. The musical has since done a US tour and opened in July 2015 in Australia. The stage version has become hugely popular with audiences and praised by critics, and won multiple Olivier Awards in the UK and Tony Awards in the US. One critic called it "the best British musical since Billy Elliot".

The novel was made into the film Matilda in 1996. It starred Mara Wilson as Matilda, and was directed by Danny DeVito, who also portrayed Mr Wormwood and narrated the story. The film changed the setting and nationality of every character (except Trunchbull who is played by Welsh actress Pam Ferris) from British to American. Although not a commercial success, it received critical acclaim at the time of its release, and on Rotten Tomatoes has a score of 90% based on reviews from 21 critics.

In December 2009, BBC Radio 4's Classic Serial broadcast a two-part adaptation by Charlotte Jones of the novel with Lenny Henry as the Narrator, Lauren Mote as Matilda, Nichola McAuliffe as Miss Trunchbull, Emerald O'Hanrahan as Miss Honey, Claire Rushbrook as Mrs. Wormwood and John Biggins as Mr. Wormwood.

In 2013, Kate Winslet, the English actress, spoke the English-language audiobook recording of Matilda. In 2014, the American Library Association shortlisted her for an Odyssey Award for her audiobook performance.

On 27 November 2018, Netflix was revealed to be adapting Matilda as an animated series, which will be part of an "animated event series" along with other Roald Dahl books such as The BFG, The Twits, and Charlie and the Chocolate Factory. A film adaptation of the musical was released by Sony Pictures Releasing and Netflix in 2022. It stars Alisha Weir as Matilda and Emma Thompson as Miss Trunchbull. It is directed by Matthew Warchus.

The novel at 30
Celebrating 30 years of the book's publication in October 2018, original illustrator Quentin Blake imagined what Matilda might be doing as a grown-up woman today. He drew images of her undertaking three possible roles: an explorer, an astrophysicist, and a librarian at the British Library.

English-language censorship
In February 2023, Puffin Books, a division of Penguin Books, announced that they would be re-writing portions of many of Roald Dahl's children's novels, changing the language to, in the publisher's words, "ensure that it can continue to be enjoyed by all today." The decision was met with criticism from groups and public figures including PEN America, Salman Rushdie, Brian Cox, Rishi Sunak, and Kemi Badenoch. In Matilda, references to Joseph Conrad and Rudyard Kipling were replaced by references to Jane Austen and John Steinbeck.

Connections to other Roald Dahl books
One of Miss Trunchbull's punishments is to force an overweight child, Bruce Bogtrotter, to eat an enormous chocolate cake, which makes him so full that he cannot move. The cook had caught him stealing a piece of cake from the kitchen. In Roald Dahl's Revolting Recipes one of the recipes is based on that cake; whereas Bruce is a more sympathetic variation of Augustus Gloop (from Charlie and the Chocolate Factory) and similar gluttons, and made something of a hero by finishing the cake without suffering nausea. The short story The Magic Finger by Roald Dahl, released in 1966, may have been a precursor to Matilda. A young girl has power within her finger to do things to other people when she gets emotional about a cause she feels strongly about.

See also
Attachment theory
Child abuse

References

 
Children's books by Roald Dahl
1988 British novels
British novels adapted into films
British novels adapted into plays
British fantasy novels
BILBY Award-winning works
British children's novels
Novels by Roald Dahl
Jonathan Cape books
Novels about bullying
Novels about child abuse
Novels about telekinesis
Novels set in Buckinghamshire
1988 children's books
Novels about teachers
Children's novels
Children's fantasy novels